Udagama Liyange Waruna Priyantha Liyanage is a  Sri Lankan politician and a member of the Sri Lankan parliament from Pelmadulla Ratnapura Electoral District as a member of the Samagi Jana Balawegaya.

References

Samagi Jana Balawegaya politicians
Living people
Members of the 16th Parliament of Sri Lanka
Year of birth missing (living people)